The Monument to  Feodor Chaliapin is a monument in Ufa.  It is located at the Noble Assembly House. Opened in 2007.

References

Monuments and memorials in Ufa
2007 establishments in Russia
Outdoor sculptures in Russia
Statues in Russia
Sculptures of men in Russia